Eric Matthias Roberts (18 February 1914 – 29 March 1997) was a Bishop of St David's during the last quarter of the 20th century.

Educated  at Friars School, Bangor and St Edmund Hall, Oxford he was ordained in 1939. After a curacy at Penmaenmawr, he was Sub-Warden of St. Michael's College, Llandaff and then Vicar of Port Talbot. After this he was the incumbent at Roath and then Archdeacon of Margam until his appointment to the episcopate in 1971. He retired in 1981.

References

1914 births
1997 deaths
People educated at Friars School, Bangor
Alumni of St Edmund Hall, Oxford
Deans of Bangor
Archdeacons of Margam
Bishops of St Davids
20th-century bishops of the Church in Wales